Bed, Bed, Bed is a book and EP package for children released by the musical group They Might Be Giants in 2003 (see 2003 in music) through Simon & Schuster. The book is composed of the lyrics of the four songs on the album, with illustrations by Marcel Dzama. The song "Bed, Bed, Bed, Bed, Bed" is a slower, quieter version of the song "Bed, Bed, Bed" from the album No!

Track/chapter listing

Publication information
Simon & Schuster, 2003, Books & CD,

External links

Bed, Bed, Bed at This Might Be A Wiki
GiantKid.net (official website)

2003 children's books
American picture books
2003 EPs
They Might Be Giants EPs